South Jersey comprises the southern portion of the U.S. state of New Jersey located between the lower Delaware River and the Atlantic Ocean. The designation of South Jersey with a distinct toponym is a colloquialism rather than an administrative definition and reflects geographical and   perceived cultural and other differences between South Jersey and the northern part of the state. South Jersey is part of the Philadelphia metropolitan area, the seventh largest metropolitan region in the nation with 6.288 million residents in the core metropolitan statistical area and 7.366 million residents in the combined statistical area as of 2020.

Benjamin Franklin called the state "a barrel tapped at both ends".  South Jersey may be defined geographically as the area below I-195 that includes the state's lower seven counties: Atlantic, Burlington, Camden, Cape May, Cumberland, Gloucester, and Salem. North Jersey is generally described as including the counties north of South Jersey that fall within the New York metropolitan area.

South Jersey and the wider Philadelphia metropolitan area have become a U.S. East Coast epicenter for logistics and warehouse construction, Salem County and the lower portion of and upper portion of Cumberland Counties additionally serve as residential communities for the petrochemical industry of New Castle County, Delaware. South Jersey shore communities, including Atlantic City and others in Atlantic and Cape May counties, have a distinct economy centered around the tourism industry. Burlington, Camden, and Gloucester counties have several older streetcar towns, and many residents from these three counties commute to Philadelphia, the nation's sixth most populous city, which is located immediately west of South Jersey across the Delaware River, accessible by the Benjamin Franklin Bridge, Betsy Ross Bridge, and Walt Whitman Bridge.

Geography

Topography
South Jersey is a peninsula bordered by the Atlantic Ocean to its southeast, the Delaware Bay to its southwest, and the Delaware River to its northwest. All of South Jersey is part of the Atlantic Plain, a landform of broad plains and gently sloping hills that extends southward from the New York Bight to Florida. Much of the Atlantic Plain is covered by pine and oak-pine forests and salt marshes and is underlain by poorly consolidated sedimentary formations from the Cretaceous, Tertiary, and Quaternary ages that dip seaward. The Atlantic Coastal Plain can be divided into three physiographic subprovinces: the Inner Lowlands, Outer Lowlands, and Central Uplands. The Inner Lowlands are fertile due to the deposition of sediment in the region, which makes it an ideal region for agriculture. The Outer Lowlands is dominated by coastal estuaries, swamplands, and barrier islands near the Atlantic Ocean and is generally infertile. The Central Uplands varies slightly from the Lowlands in altitude and is covered by the New Jersey Pine Barrens. The Uplands has rolling hills at an elevation over 50 feet, rarely exceeding 200 feet in elevation, along with sandy, acidic soil that is unsuitable for agriculture. Commercial farming in the Pine Barrens is limited to plants that thrive in its nutrient-poor soil, generally restricted to acidic fruits. In the Pine Barrens, cranberries and blueberries are cultivated in lowland bogs that have accumulated depths of organic matter.

Climate
South Jersey has a humid subtropical climate. Compared to northern parts of New Jersey, South Jersey has slightly higher temperatures and receives less annual precipitation. Along the Jersey Shore, temperatures are moderated by sea breezes.

Counties
The following seven counties are completely included in South Jersey:
 Atlantic County
 Burlington County
 Camden County
 Cape May County
 Cumberland County
 Gloucester County
 Salem County

Many definitions of South Jersey include the southern portion of Ocean County, including Long Beach Island.

In April 2015, an NJ.com poll with 90,000 respondents asked readers to identify the communities in North, Central, and South Jersey. Barnegat, Eagleswood, Lacey Township, Little Egg Harbor, Long Beach Island, Ocean Township, Stafford Township, and Tuckerton were all voted as part of South Jersey.  The Ocean County communities north of Lacey Township were considered to be part of Central Jersey. The northernmost communities of Burlington County was also voted part of Central Jersey.

Cities

Principal cities
Camden, located across the Delaware River from Philadelphia, has historically been considered the economic hub of South Jersey. Much of Camden's growth resulted from its location near Philadelphia and its role as a regional transportation hub. For decades following World War II, Camden suffered a prolonged economic decline and high crime rate due to the loss of its manufacturing base and the outflow of middle-class residents to the suburbs.  Campbell's Soup headquarters and the new corporate headquarters of Susquehanna Bank. Rutgers University–Camden, Rutgers Law School, Cooper Medical School of Rowan University, Cooper University Hospital, and the Camden campus of Camden County College operate in Camden, and the Camden Waterfront is one of the city's main attractions. Nearby, Cherry Hill, the second largest municipality in South Jersey and the 12th largest in New Jersey by population, is an edge city that also serves as a regional economic center. Pureland Industrial Complex, the nation's largest industrial park, is located 12 miles from the port of Camden in Logan Township.

Atlantic City is a major tourist destination that is famous for its beaches, boardwalk, and casino gambling. Atlantic City is located in the Jersey Shore region on Absecon Island, along with Ventnor City, Margate City, and Longport. Atlantic City became a resort town in 1854, when train service to the city allowed beachgoers from Philadelphia to vacation in the city. The first boardwalk in the world opened in the city in 1870, and large hotels were built in the early 20th century to accommodate visitors. In the mid-20th century, Atlantic City declined as a tourist destination due to competition from other resorts made accessible by automobile and aircraft. After New Jersey voters approved casino gambling in Atlantic City in a 1976 referendum, it became the first legalized casino gambling destination in the Eastern United States. Recent growth in the city has been fueled by the casino industry, and Atlantic City is the second-largest casino gaming market in the United States behind Las Vegas.

Metropolitan areas
According to the U.S. Census Bureau, Burlington, Camden, and Gloucester Counties are part of the Camden metropolitan division with an estimated population of 1,250,569 as of 2008. Salem County is part of the Wilmington metropolitan division. The Camden and Wilmington metropolitan divisions are part of the larger Philadelphia–Camden–Wilmington metropolitan statistical area, the eighth largest MSA in the U.S. Cumberland County is part of the Vineland–Millville–Bridgeton Metropolitan Statistical Area. Atlantic City and its surrounding region in Atlantic County are part of the Atlantic City metropolitan area, which had an estimated 2008 population of 270,681. Cape May County is part of the Ocean City metropolitan area with an estimated 2008 population of 95,838. Atlantic, Cape May, and Cumberland counties are all part of the Philadelphia-Camden-Vineland combined statistical area.

Ocean County, with a 2020 population of 637,229, is considered part of the New York–North Jersey–Long Island Metropolitan Statistical Area, which encompasses all of North Jersey and Central Jersey with the exception of Warren County. However, much of Ocean County lies in both New York City and Philadelphia media markets.

Population

History

Native Americans
Present-day South Jersey was first inhabited by the Lenape and was the site of the first Indian reservation. The tribe spoke Unami dialects, part of the Algonquian language family. Because the Lenape were concentrated around the Delaware River and its tributaries, Europeans later named them the Delaware Indians. After the arrival of the Europeans, the Lenape population dwindled quickly due to disease and conflict. Those who were left migrated north or west, or became integrated into local settler communities.

Colonial period

Although present-day South Jersey was claimed by the Dutch in 1609, the Dutch used the region primarily for trading purposes. In 1638, New Sweden was established along the Delaware River. The Swedes established two permanent settlements in present-day South Jersey: Swedesboro and Bridgeport, formerly named New Stockholm. New Sweden was captured by the Dutch in 1655, and remained part of New Netherland until its cession to the British in 1667.

During the British colonial period, nearly all of South Jersey was part of the Province of West Jersey between 1674 and 1702 as a Quaker commonwealth. Burlington, the capital of West Jersey, was established in 1677, and Camden was established in 1681. Since the Delaware River was not easily navigable north of Trenton, the population was concentrated along the southern Delaware River. The borders between West Jersey and East Jersey, first surveyed using the Keith line, ran diagonally across the middle part of the state. The borders remained important in determining ownership and political boundaries until 1745. Remnants of that division are seen today, notably as the Burlington-Monmouth and Burlington-Ocean County lines and the municipal boundaries within Ocean County. In contemporary culture, the border signifies a functional boundary between the New York City and Philadelphia spheres of influence.

By 1700, nearly 70% of the population of West Jersey were Quakers of English or Irish origin. The Quakers, who believed in peace, equality, and integrity, influenced early New Jersey. In contrast, East Jersey had high proportions of Scottish and Dutch settlers. In 1702, East Jersey and West Jersey were reunited under the reign of Queen Anne.

American Revolution
Resistance to the British was widespread during the American Revolution among South Jersey Presbyterians, who aided the colonists during the Revolutionary War. Several of their preachers, including John Brainerd, accepted military positions and urged Presbyterians to enlist in the army. During the war, the Delaware River was strategic for its commercial importance and its role in defending Philadelphia. General Howe captured Philadelphia in September 1777, occupying the city for 10 months. The Quakers as a whole were opposed to the Revolution on their principles of nonviolence. Members of the Religious Society of Friends were forbidden to support the local militias, or faced disownment by the Quakers.

19th century

For many years, South Jersey has been mistakenly perceived solely as an agricultural society. In the 18th century, South Jersey, including Alloway in Salem County, was home to Wistarburg, the first successful glass factory in the colonies, operating for close to 50 years prior to the Revolutionary War. When that factory closed, the workers spread throughout the region to South Jersey towns, including Millville, Vineland Bridgeton, Hammonton, and Glassboro where they established new companies. Recent research has uncovered evidence that, in addition to the glassmaking industry, South Jersey was also a major contributor to the iron, coal making, ship building and, later, textile industries. Other businesses that later operated in the region included shoe manufacturers, button makers, barrel makers, and rug companies. While most industries eventually declined, farming still made up the larger portion of the region's economy. South Jersey's interior, consisting of the New Jersey Pine Barrens and marshland, remained unpopulated because its acidic, nutrient-poor soil that was unsuited for farming. Most of the cities were concentrated along the Delaware River except for a few settlements and seaside resorts along the Jersey Shore.

Slavery was less extensive in South Jersey than it was in other parts of the state because of the Quakers' religious opposition to it, and a lower demand for labor in the region. By 1810, the population of slaves dwindled to 328 total, compared to 10,532 total slaves in the rest of New Jersey. Although discriminatory policies still targeted blacks, South Jersey became a haven for ex-slaves. William Still, a notable African-American abolitionist, was born in Burlington County, and is nicknamed the "father of the Underground Railroad" for his role in helping slaves escape to freedom.

Railroads came into operation in South Jersey by the mid-19th century. The advent of the railroad was one of the reasons Charles K. Landis was inspired to found Vineland in 1861. The rail system expanded dramatically during that period, helping a number of towns to grow and thrive. Many of the railroads were later consolidated into the West Jersey and Seashore Railroad (WJ&S). By 1925, it operated 379 miles of road on 717 miles of track. In 1933, it became part of Pennsylvania-Reading Seashore Lines, a Pennsylvania Railroad subsidiary. Much of the system is part of the South Jersey/Philadelphia Shared Assets Area. The Glassboro–Camden Line, a light rail system, is currently under construction.

20th century

Beginning in the 20th century, the towns bordering the Delaware River saw increased manufacturing due to improved transportation and technology. By 1899, John Thompson Dorrance, a chemist for Campbell Soup Company, perfected his method of canning condensed soup. This allowed Campbell to ship and sell its product at one-third the cost. Campbell had national distribution by 1911 when its products were first marketed in California. The New York Shipbuilding Corporation opened its first shipyard in 1900 in Camden. The company produced a variety of ships, ranging from aircraft carriers and battleships to luxury liners and barges. By 1917, NYSB was the world's largest shipyard. The Victor Talking Machine Company, founded in 1901, became the leading American producer of phonographs and phonograph records.

Like many American cities after World War II, the manufacturing cities of South Jersey declined as factories closed and residents moved away. Suburbanization of the region was fueled by the construction of new highways and bridges, and increased automobile ownership. The New Jersey Turnpike opened in 1951, permitting fast travel by car between New York and Delaware. In 1955, William Levitt built present-day Willingboro based on his Levittown model, which came to be used for other suburban developments. The population of Delaware Township in Camden County rose explosively after World War II, growing from about 10,000 residents in 1950 to almost 65,000 by 1970. In 1961, the township was renamed Cherry Hill. In contrast, nearby Camden declined from 125,000 residents in 1950 to 85,000 in 1980. While the South Jersey suburbs remain general middle-class, the inner cities continue to face issues with crime, poverty, and unemployment.

Statehood movement
Albert Freeman, a Mount Holly newspaper publisher and editor, wrote an editorial calling for secession. Freeman originally meant the proposal as a joke, but the idea gained momentum. On April 23, 1980, the town council of Egg Harbor voted to support the creation of a new state of South Jersey. The statehood movement was an attempt to gain the attention of state lawmakers, centering on issues such as the construction of the Meadowlands Sports Complex in the north while the state refused to support the Garden State Park Racetrack in the south. A non-binding referendum was presented to six counties in 1980 (with the exclusion of Camden and Gloucester counties), and 51 percent of voters declared that they wanted to secede and establish a new state; Ocean County was the only southern county of six that voted to defeat the referendum.

Economic environment
In 2005, Money magazine named Moorestown the "best place to live" in the United States,  although they stated that a number of nearby municipalities could have just as easily been given the distinction.

Conversely, Morgan Quitno has rated nearby Camden the "most dangerous city" in the United States three times within the same decade and Camden had a median household income of $18,007 in 2006, making it the poorest U.S. city with over 65,000 residents. Moorestown and Camden share a central highway, NJ County Road 537.

Demographics 
The average income for a household in South Jersey was $63,834.54, and the population was 65.3% non-Hispanic White, 15.9% non-Hispanic Black, 11.6% Hispanic or Latino of any race, 4.2% non-Hispanic Asian, and 3.0% non-Hispanic other or mixed race. South Jersey had a total population of 1,854,453 in 2010 (up from 693,402 in 1940) if the counties of Camden, Burlington, Gloucester, Salem, Atlantic, Cape May, and Cumberland are included.

Colleges and universities 
 Cooper Medical School of Rowan University
 Georgian Court University
 Kean University-Ocean County campus
 Rowan University
 Rowan-Virtua School of Osteopathic Medicine
 Rutgers University–Camden
 Rutgers Law School
 Stockton University in Galloway Township and its satellite campus in Stafford Township

Community colleges
 Atlantic Cape Community College
 Camden County College
 Ocean County College
 Rowan College at Burlington County
 Rowan College of South Jersey, Gloucester and Cumberland campuses
 Salem Community College

Additionally, Rutgers University has academic satellites at Atlantic Cape Community College in Mays Landing and Camden County Community College in Blackwood.  Rutgers also has a number of research field stations located in South Jersey, including the Philip E. Marucci Center for Blueberry and Cranberry Research and Extension in Chatsworth and the Rutgers University Marine Field Station in Tuckerton.

Sports
Many South Jerseyans root for Philadelphia professional sports teams including the Phillies, Eagles, Flyers, 76ers, and Union. In southern Ocean County, there is a strong mix of Philadelphia and New York sports fans since the county's media markets overlap. While there are no major league teams in South Jersey, in recent seasons the 76ers have held training camp at Stockton University in Galloway Township.  In 2016, the 76ers opened a practice facility on the Camden waterfront.  The Flyers practice in Voorhees.

South Jersey has been home to a number of minor league teams. Currently, the Jersey Shore BlueClaws play in Lakewood and are an affiliate of the Phillies.  Minor league soccer is also played in South Jersey, as the Ocean City Nor'easters of the Premier Development League are based in Ocean City.  The Nor'easters play their home games at Carey Stadium.

In 2007, the WNBA was considering expansion in Atlantic City. The Atlantic City ownership group competed with other groups from Philadelphia, Atlanta, Kansas City, Albuquerque, Colorado, and the San Francisco Bay Area.  In the end, the expansion franchise was awarded to Atlanta.

South Jersey was home to the now-defunct independent league baseball teams the Atlantic City Surf and Camden Riversharks. Outside of baseball, South Jersey was also home to  the Atlantic City Boardwalk Bullies, a minor league ice hockey team affiliated with the East Coast Hockey League. The Jersey Knights of the World Hockey Association played at the Cherry Hill Arena in Cherry Hill from 1973 to 1974. Previously, the minor league Jersey Devils of the Eastern Hockey League played at Cherry Hill Arena from 1964 to 1973.

Commercial centers and resorts
South Jersey's regional commercial centers include: Cherry Hill, Camden, and Atlantic City with its resort casinos, boardwalk, shopping, and beaches.

Other South Jersey Seaside resorts and commercial centers include:

 Avalon
 Barnegat Light
 Barnegat
 Beach Haven
 Brigantine

 Cape May
 Lacey
 Long Beach Island
 Longport
 Manahawkin

 Margate
 North Wildwood
 Ocean City
 Sea Isle City
 Surf City

 Stone Harbor
 Tuckerton
 Wildwood
 Wildwood Crest
 Ventnor

Media
South Jersey is part of the Philadelphia television and radio market. Newspapers in the region include the Courier-Post, which refers to itself as "South Jersey's Newspaper" and is based in Camden County. It covers all of South Jersey but focuses primarily on these three counties. The South Jersey Times, based in Mullica Hill, also covers South Jersey but spotlights Gloucester, Cumberland, and Salem counties.

Notable residents
Some nationally known South Jerseyans include Bruce Willis, Mike Trout, Roscoe Lee Browne, John Forsythe, Ali Larter, Kelly Ripa, Tara Lipinski, Michael Landon, Linda Fiorentino, Joe Flacco, Carl Lewis, Grace Helbig, Martin Truex Jr., Steve Kaplan, and Carli Lloyd.  See also:
 People from Atlantic County
 People from Burlington County
 People from Camden County
 People from Cape May County
 People from Cumberland County
 People from Gloucester County
 People from Ocean County (some consider this Central Jersey)
 People from Salem County

Culture and business
A list of unique and notable South Jersey cultural and business institutions includes, but is not limited, to:

 Absecon Light
 Adventure Aquarium
 Barnegat Light
 Batsto Village
 Blueberry farms in Hammonton
 Cape May Light
 Casinos in Atlantic City
 Clementon Amusement Park
 Commerce Bank
 Cooper River
 Cranberry bogs
 Double Trouble State Park
 Garden State Park Racetrack
 Hadrosaurus
 Hereford Inlet Light
 Historic Smithville
 Indian King Tavern
 Island Beach State Park
 Jersey Devil
 Jughandles

 Lucy the Elephant
 New Jersey Pine Barrens
 New Jersey Pinelands National Reserve
 Nipper Building
 Ocean City Boardwalk
 "On the Way to Cape May"
 Oyster Creek Nuclear Generating Station
 PATCO High Speed Line
 Perkins Center for the Arts in Moorestown and Collingswood
 Popcorn Park Zoo
 Shore Culture
 Six Flags Great Adventure
 Traffic circles
 Surflight Theatre
 Tuckerton Seaport
 Walt Whitman House
 Washington Street Mall
 WheatonArts
 Wildwood Boardwalk
 USS New Jersey

South Jersey English

South Jersey is within the Philadelphia dialect region.

Visitors to South Jersey will notice the following usages standard in the Delaware Valley:
 Hoagie: This usual term for what might elsewhere be called a submarine sandwich.
 Wooder: the first syllable in the word water is pronounced like the word "wood".
 Jimmies: used to refer to the chocolate or rainbow variety of sprinkles used on cakes and ice cream.  The term is also used in the Boston area but is uncommon in North Jersey.
 Down the shore: To head "down the shore" is to spend time in the Jersey coastal resort areas.  Once you are down the shore, for the day or at a residence in the area, you can go to the beach, or the boardwalk, and so forth. The phrase was even used as the name of a short-lived sitcom, Down the Shore, although this was set in central New Jersey.
 Shoobie: slang used by year-long residents of the coast for vacationing visitors to the shore, often from Philadelphia or New York City.

See also

 Central Jersey
 North Jersey

References

External links

 Visit South Jersey official website

 
Delaware Valley
New Jersey culture
Peninsulas of New Jersey
Proposed states and territories of the United States
Regions of New Jersey
Separatism in the United States